Events in the year 1997 in Germany.

Incumbents
President - Roman Herzog 
Chancellor – Helmut Kohl

Events

Michael Jackson
Michael Jackson performed in 1997 July 4 and July 6 as a part of the HIStory Tour. He also performed in 1992 as a part of Dangerous Tour

Births

 7 January – Sophie Scheder, artistic gymnast
 23 May – Alina Reh, long-distance runner

Deaths

 February 1 – Heiner Carow, film director and screenwriter (born 1929)
 March 1 – Hans Robert Jauss, academic (born 1921)
 May 22 - Klaus von Bismarck, journalist (born 1912)
 May 26 - Manfred von Ardenne, research and applied physicist and inventor (born 1907). 
 26 June – Adolf Weidmann, athlete and sports official (born 1901)
 27 September – Walter Trampler, German violist (b. 1915)
 29 October 29 – Alexander zu Dohna-Schlobitten, German Junker, soldier, and author (b. 1899)

References

 
Years of the 20th century in Germany
1990s in Germany
Germany
Germany